Indian River is a river in Hamilton County and Essex County in the U.S. State of New York. Indian River begins at Indian Lake south of the Hamlet of Indian Lake and flows northeastward, through Lake Abanakee, before converging with the Hudson River northeast of the Hamlet of Indian Lake.

References

Rivers of New York (state)
Rivers of Essex County, New York
Rivers of Hamilton County, New York